The Consolidated Slave Law was a law which was enacted by the Barbados legislature in 1826. Following Bussa's Rebellion, London officials were concerned about further risk of revolts and instituted a policy of amelioration. This was resisted by white Barbadian planters. In consequence, the Consolidated Slave Act was a compromise: it simultaneously granted concessions to the slaves whilst also providing reassurances to the slave owners.

Three concessions to the slaves were:

 The right to own property
 The right to give evidence in courts in all cases
 A reduction in manumission fees

Three concessions granted to the slave owners were:

 That a white person could kill a slave during a revolt with impunity
 The capital punishment of any slave who threatened the life of a white person
 That all free black people needed a correct evidence of the such rights or they will be presumed to be enslaved

See also 

 Amelioration Act 1798
 William Huskisson

References 

Law of Barbados
1826 in law
1826 in the British Empire
1826 in North America
Slavery law